William Paul Whittaker (20 December 1922 – 30 August 1977) was an English professional footballer who played in the Football League for Charlton Athletic, Huddersfield Town and Crystal Palace as a wing half. He guested for eight additional clubs during the Second World War. Whittaker later played for and managed Eastern Counties League club Cambridge United.

Career statistics

Honours 
Charlton Athletic

 FA Cup: 1946–47

References

1922 births
English footballers
Footballers from Charlton, London
Association football wing halves
English Football League players
Charlton Athletic F.C. players
Huddersfield Town A.F.C. players
Crystal Palace F.C. players
Cambridge United F.C. players
English Football League representative players
1977 deaths
Clapton Orient F.C. wartime guest players
Fulham F.C. wartime guest players
West Ham United F.C. wartime guest players
Liverpool F.C. wartime guest players
Watford F.C. wartime guest players
Chelsea F.C. wartime guest players
Brentford F.C. wartime guest players
Plymouth Argyle F.C. wartime guest players
Cambridge United F.C. managers
English football managers
FA Cup Final players

England schools international footballers